Enrique Bunster (July 2, 1912 – November 25, 1976) was a Chilean novelist and playwright. He won the Municipal Prize of Literature of Santiago for Isla de la bucaneros in 1946.

Works
 La primera noche galante, 1933
 Teatro verosímil, 1933
 Nadie puede saberlo, 1934
 Casa de locos, 1937
 Un velero sale del puerto, 1937
 El hombre y sus recuerdos, 1938
 Después de sus días, 1938
 El tren de carga, 1938
 Isla de los Bucaneros, 1940
 Lord Cochrane, 1943
 La isla de los Bucaneros, 1948
 Bombardeo de Valparaíso, 1948
 Corresponsal de la Antártica, 1948
 Motín en Punta Arenas, 1950
 Mar del Sur, 1951
 Teatro Breve, 1953
 Chilenos en California, 1954
 La Orana Tahití, 1956
 Para reír y rabiar, 1958
 Un ángel para Chile, 1959
 Aroma de Polinesia, 1959
 Cuentos Selectos, 1973
 Oro y Sangre, 1974
 Distinguidas historias, 1976
 Crónicas Portalianas, 1977
 Crónica del Pacífico, 1977
 Operación Vela
 Recuerdos y Pájaros, 1968
 Tiempo Atrás
 Casa de Antigüedades
 Bala en Boca
 Crónicas Azul y Verde, 1995
 Vía Cabo de Hornos, 1998

References

1912 births
1976 deaths
People from Santiago
Chilean male novelists
Chilean male dramatists and playwrights
20th-century Chilean dramatists and playwrights
20th-century Chilean novelists
20th-century Chilean male writers